As of March 2021, Emirates operates to 161 destinations in 85 countries across six continents from its hub in Dubai. It has a particularly strong presence in the South and Southeast Asian region, which together connect Dubai with more international destinations in the region than any other Middle Eastern airline. The countries with the largest number of destinations served by Emirates are the United States with 12 (13 airports), India with 9, Pakistan and the United Kingdom with 5 (7 airports in the UK) and Australia, Germany, Italy and Saudi Arabia with 4. 

This is a list of destinations which Emirates flies to as of May 2020; the list includes the country, city, and airport names. Additionally, there are labels for airports that are the airline's hub, future cities, and former destinations that have been discontinued. Doha, Qatar is one of the discontinued destinations as a result of the Qatar diplomatic crisis, even though the crisis was resolved in 2021, Emirates have not resumed their flights to Doha.

List of destinations

References

Destinations
Lists of airline destinations